Kiekrz railway station is a railway station serving the village of Kiekrz, in the Greater Poland Voivodeship, Poland. The station is located on the Poznań–Szczecin railway and Zieliniec–Kiekrz railway. The train services are operated by Przewozy Regionalne.

Train services
The station is served by the following service(s):

Regional services (R) Szczecin - Stargard - Dobiegniew - Krzyz - Wronki - Poznan

References

 This article is based upon a translation of the Polish language version as of October 2016.

External links

Railway stations in Greater Poland Voivodeship
Wola